Klabava is a municipality and village in Rokycany District in the Plzeň Region of the Czech Republic. It has about 500 inhabitants.

Transport
Klabava is located on the regional railway line from Plzeň to Beroun.

References

Villages in Rokycany District